Han So-yeon (Hangul: 한소연; born 18 April 1995) is a South Korean badminton player. She was selected to join the Korea national badminton team in 2015.

Achievements

BWF World Junior Championships 
Girls' doubles

BWF International Challenge/Series 
Women's singles

Women's doubles

  BWF International Challenge tournament
  BWF International Series tournament

References

External links 
 

1995 births
Living people
South Korean female badminton players